James Spiers Kerr was a Scottish music publisher.

Career 
Kerr Music Corporation Limited was founded in 1952. It publishes several vintage titles under the names of the original publishers: James S. Kerr, Mozart Allan, and Bayley and Ferguson. Current titles include Kerr’s Merry Melodies and Skinner’s Scottish Violinist.
It is listed at the 79 Berkeley Street address.

In 1952 the company published the most famous song about Aberdeen, "The Northern Lights of Old Aberdeen" (as sung by Robert Wilson). This song was composed in 1952 by Mel and Mary Webb who were English and had never visited Aberdeen.

References

External links
http://www.nigelgatherer.com/books/kerr/kcal.html
http://www.dustymusic.com/sheetinfo.php?id=1200

Music publishers (people)
Scottish writers about music
Year of birth missing
Place of birth missing
Year of death missing
Place of death missing